Operation Verano ("Operation Summer") was the name given to the summer offensive in 1958 by the Batista government during the Cuban Revolution, known to the rebels as La Ofensiva. The offensive was designed to crush Fidel Castro's revolutionary army, which had been growing in strength in the area of the Sierra Maestra hills since their arrival in Cuba on board the Granma yacht in December 1956. The offensive was met with resistance, notably at the Battle of La Plata and the Battle of Las Mercedes, and failed in its objective. The failure left the Cuban army dispirited and demoralized. Castro viewed it as a victory and soon launched his own offensive.

Background
Throughout 1957, Fidel Castro's small band of revolutionaries operated out of a mountain base, staging hit and run attacks on the government of Batista. The Cuban army and political leadership did not take these attacks seriously for a long time. The attitude of Batista changed in the Spring of 1958 as Castro started to gain international recognition and he  called for a General Strike. Batista decided to destroy Castro's small army, so in May 1958, General Eulogio Cantillo was given the mission.

Cantillo's plan was to use nearly all of the Cuban regular army (24 battalions or about 20,000 men) to surround the Sierra Maestra, set up a blockade to prevent weapons from going in, and then attack from the north with 14 battalions. Given the true strength of Castro's forces (about 300 fighters), Cantillo's plan seemed like overkill, but the Cuban military vastly overstated Castro's true strength, they thought Castro had between 1,000 and 2,000 veteran guerrillas.

Batista refused to allocate so many forces to the attack, instead Cantillo was given just 14 battalions (12,000 men), of which 7,000 were new recruits with little training and little incentive to actually fight (in actual battle, the new recruits would rarely fight and often did nothing). Given the fact that Batista would lose control of the country because the offensive failed, this decision was a bad one. Yet another bad decision was to divide operational control between two Generals, Cantillo and the ineffective (but politically well connected) General Alberto del Rio Chaviano. Chaviano did nothing to help in the campaign and frequently complained about Cantillo's failures.

Castro's troops knew the terrain well, and they set up mine fields and built defensive positions along the major routes through which they expected the army to attack. Castro had excellent knowledge of where the army was and what they were planning. He also had the support of local peasants, who assisted in the transmission of information on Cantillo's troops and risked their lives to hide rebel supplies.

The battle
The first attack was on June 28, 1958 with an attack that moved out of the Estrada Palma Sugar Mill (see the map). This attack was halted by an ambush from Che Guevara's troops. Armored cars that moved off the road ran into a previously laid mine field. The army began to retreat while Che's troops continued to fire at them. The army lost 86 men, Che's troops lost 3.

On July 11, the army landed Battalion 18 at the mouth of the La Plata river. This action is sometimes called the Battle of La Plata or the battle of Jigüe. The idea was to surround Castro's mountain defences at Turquino Peak. The Cuban soldiers (most were new recruits) again were ambushed by Castro's guerrillas and were soon surrounded and immobilized. A second battalion was landed to try to help but they were halted at the beach. A third battalion (number 17) was sent to help but they ran into another part of Castro's forces and did not push through the road blocks. After more than a week, on July 21, Battalion 18 surrendered: 40 dead, 30 wounded, and 240 became prisoners. Castro's troops lost just three of their own men.

General Cantillo decided to withdraw Battalion 17 but he planned to make the withdrawal a trap if Castro chose to follow the retreating soldiers. This resulted in the Battle of Las Mercedes. Castro's troops, for the first time, were caught by the trap and more than 70 were killed in the first two days of fighting, including a senior rebel leader, René Ramos Latour. Castro managed to get his army out of the trap by opening negotiations with General Cantillo and Batista. By August 8, all of Castro's forces had escaped and the government's offensive was over.

Aftermath
By trying and failing to destroy Castro's guerrilla army, the Batista government looked weak and ineffective. Furthermore, The impact of this debacle upon the morale of the Cuban army was devastating. The majority of the junior officers who had fought so hard over the preceding weeks were disgusted that Cantillo had even stooped to negotiate. Moreover, Castro's masterful maneuver had come at just the juncture when the regular army, after having fought well for the first time in the campaign, seemed to have all the advantages.

Uplifted by the government's failure, Castro went on the offensive and within 4 months, he had taken control of Cuba.

References

Sources
 The Spirit Of Moncada by Larry Bockman (Major, USMC) 1984.
 Jeffrey S. Dixon, Meredith Reid Sarkees, A Guide to Intrastate Wars: An Examination of Civil, Regional, and Intercommunal Wars, 1816-2014, CQ Press, 2015

Cuban Revolution
Opposition to Fidel Castro
1958 in Cuba
Conflicts in 1958